Bwenyi is a minor Bantu language of the Republic of Congo.

References

Mboshi languages
Languages of the Republic of the Congo